Hakirah may refer to:

 (Medieval) Jewish philosophy
 Hakirah (journal), a peer-reviewed academic journal in the field of halakha and Jewish thought

See also 
Shakira (disambiguation)